Martin Kupper (born 31 May 1989, in Tallinn) is an Estonian track and field athlete who competes in the discus throw. He is a member of the Audentese SK sports club.

He made his debut at the European Championships in 2014 and finished the competition in ninth place. He put himself at the top of the seasonal lists at the start of the following year with a  win at the 2015 European Cup Winter Throwing – his first international medal. He began to compete on the 2015 IAAF Diamond League circuit and had fourth-place finishes in Shanghai and Eugene.

International competitions

References

External links
 
 
 

1989 births
Living people
Athletes from Tallinn
Estonian male discus throwers
World Athletics Championships athletes for Estonia
Athletes (track and field) at the 2016 Summer Olympics
Olympic athletes of Estonia